Rezaabad (also Romanized as Reẕāābād and Rezāābād; also known as Reẕāābād-e Salīāneh) is a village in Yusefvand Rural District, in the Central District of Selseleh County, Lorestan Province, Iran. At the 2006 census, its population was 38, in 8 families.

References 

Towns and villages in Selseleh County